New Madrid may refer to:

New Madrid County, Missouri, a county in the U.S. state of Missouri
New Madrid, Missouri, a city in New Madrid County
New Madrid Seismic Zone, a major seismic zone in Missouri, Tennessee, and Arkansas
New Madrid earthquake, a series of four earthquakes that occurred in late 1811 and early 1812
 "New Madrid" (song), by Uncle Tupelo from their 1993 album Anodyne
New Madrid, a literary journal published by Murray State University
Birds Point-New Madrid Floodway